Mud Bay Indian Shaker Church is the first church built by the Indian Shaker Church.

The first Shaker Indian church, also called the "mother church", was built  1885 near Olympia, then the capital of Washington Territory. The structure was built on a shoulder of the Black Hills above Mud Bay, at the southern end of Eld Inlet, an arm of Puget Sound. It was near the homes of Louis "Mud Bay Louie" Yowaluch (aka Mud Bay Louis) and his brother Sam "Mud Bay Sam" Yowaluch, co-founders of the church, first and second "headman"s respectively. Mud Bay Sam was the first Bishop (church leader) after incorporation of Shaker Indian Church in 1910.

The original church was oriented in an east-west direction, in a manner that would set the pattern for subsequent church architecture. The earliest several churches were about  plain wooden buildings with  shingle roofs, stout wooden doors and floors. The Mud Bay church was rebuilt in 1910.

See also
List of Indian Shaker Church buildings in Washington

References

Sources

External links

Buildings and structures in Thurston County, Washington
Churches in Washington (state)
1880s in Washington Territory